Kunjal Mata Temple of goddess Kunjal is located in Deh village of Jayal tehsil in Nagaur district of Rajasthan, India, and   away from Deh's Bus Station on Nagaur-Ladnun National Highway-65.

Kunjal Mata is kul devi of Pareek Brahmin's (Joshi, Kanthadia, Sakraniya and many other Pareek gotras).

Temple area is 38 Bigha.

It is A Historical Place of Rajasthan.

External links 
Kunjal Mata Mandir

References 

Hindu temples in Rajasthan
Nagaur district